E. fulgida may refer to:

 Eatonina fulgida, a sea snail
 Ereunetea fulgida, a geometer moth
 Euphoria fulgida, a scarab beetle